Accenture plc is an Irish–American professional services company based in Dublin, specializing in information technology services and consulting

It has been a very acquisitive company, completing more than 275 acquisitions since it split off from Arthur Andersen. The following is a list of acquisitions by Accenture.  The value of each acquisition is listed if known. If the value of an acquisition is not listed, then it is undisclosed.

Acquisitions

References

Accenture